Self-Certification, officially known as Professional Certification, is a process by which licensed professionals may bypass a full review of a building project by the New York City Department of Buildings.

History

According to the New York Times, the Department of Buildings has for decades allowed "...licensed professionals [to] self-certify that components of the construction process itself—installation of the girders, the bolts, the concrete, the fireproofing, the wiring and more—are performed according to code.

In 1995, under Mayor Giuliani, this program was expanded to include the design itself.  With this streamlined approvals process, Registered Architects and Engineers may self-certify that a project complies with all applicable laws and codes, and the project can be approved without a full review by plan examiners (though some twenty percent of applications are randomly selected for audit).

Some Architects prefer a modified Self Certification process, first submitting a project for a normal review and receiving back a list of objections by the plan examiner, then self-certifying any revisions made in response to those objections.  

48% of new building applications in 2006 were self-certified.

Abuse

The Self Certification program has been cited by some as easy to abuse.  A number of Architects have been investigated over the years by the Department of Buildings for self-certifying projects that did not actually conform to building codes and zoning regulations.  

In 2002, investigators with the New York City Department of Buildings alleged that Architect Henry Radusky "failed to follow required codes" on 55 building projects".  In response, Radusky agreed to voluntarily surrender his Self Certification privileges for one year.

In 2006, Architect Robert Scarano was brought before the City's Office of Administrative Trials and Hearings for alleged building code and zoning violations on a number of Self Certified projects. The allegations were mutually settled in August 2006, with Scarano surrendering his Self Certifications privileges.

The Department of Buildings announced in February 2008 that, instead of accepting self-certified plans by default, by the end of the year it would require architects and engineers to apply for the privilege.

Penalties

The usual penalty for abuse is revocation of Self Certification privileges.  The Department of Buildings cannot revoke a professional's license to practice Architecture or Engineering, as that is controlled by the New York State Office of the Professions.  However, since 2007 the State has allowed the DOB to refuse to accept plans filed by individuals who have been found to abuse the Self Certification process (or other regulations).

The Department of Buildings used this law for the first time in January 2008, banning engineer Leon St. Clair Nation from filing any work in the City for at least two years.  Nation had allegedly filed fake plans and doctored photographs.  Expediter Hershy Fekete was also implicated, but an administrative judge ruled that expediters were not covered by the 2007 law.

In February 2007, the Brooklyn AIA announced in their newsletter that the City Council had proposed revising the city's administrative code regarding misconduct related to Self Certification.  The revised code would establish a process whereby architects and engineers whose self-certification privileges have been revoked could have these privileges restored after one year.  A six-month probationary period would follow, and any further misconduct would result in permanent revocation of privileges.

See also
 New York City Department of Buildings

References

New York City Department of Buildings